22nd Street may refer to:
 22nd Street (San Francisco), one of the steepest streets in the world
 22nd Street (Saskatoon), an arterial road in Saskatoon, Saskatchewan
 Cermak Road, Chicago, Illinois; formerly 22nd Street